All the Best, Isaac Hayes is a studio album by the American singer and songwriter Mark Kozelek, released on April 24, 2020 on Caldo Verde Records. Recorded between October and November 2019, it is Kozelek's thirty-first studio album.

The album features spoken word, stream of consciousness compositions with piano accompaniment throughout. Its lyrical content focuses on Kozelek's experiences during a 2019 North American tour and its aftermath.

Track listing

References

2020 albums
Mark Kozelek albums
Spoken word albums by American artists